The Northrop Grumman (formerly Grumman) EA-6B Prowler is a twin-engine, four-seat, mid-wing electronic-warfare aircraft derived from the A-6 Intruder airframe. The EA-6A was the initial electronic warfare version of the A-6 used by the United States Marine Corps and United States Navy. Development on the more advanced EA-6B began in 1966. An EA-6B aircrew consisted of one pilot and three Electronic Countermeasures Officers, though it was not uncommon for only two ECMOs to be used on missions. It was capable of carrying and firing anti-radiation missiles (ARMs), such as the AGM-88 HARM.

The Prowler was in service with the U.S. Armed Forces from 1971 until 2019. It carried out numerous missions for jamming enemy radar systems, and in gathering radio intelligence on those and other enemy air defense systems. From the 1998 retirement of the United States Air Force EF-111 Raven electronic warfare aircraft, the EA-6B was the only dedicated electronic warfare plane available for missions by the U.S. Navy, the U.S. Marine Corps, and the U.S. Air Force until the fielding of the Navy's EA-18G Growler in 2009. Following its last deployment in late 2014, the EA-6B was withdrawn from U.S. Navy service in June 2015, followed by the USMC in March 2019.

Development

Origins
The EA-6A "Electric Intruder" was developed for the U.S. Marine Corps during the 1960s to replace its EF-10B Skyknights. The EA-6A was a direct conversion of the standard A-6 Intruder airframe, with two seats, equipped with electronic warfare (EW) equipment. The EA-6A was used by three Marine Corps squadrons during the Vietnam War. A total of 27 EA-6As were produced, 15 of which were newly manufactured. Most of these EA-6As were retired from service in the 1970s with the last few being used by the Navy with two electronic attack "aggressor" squadrons, with all examples finally retired in the 1990s. The EA-6A was essentially an interim warplane until the more-advanced EA-6B could be designed and built.

The substantially redesigned and more advanced EA-6B was developed beginning in 1966 as a replacement for EKA-3B Skywarriors for the U.S. Navy. The forward fuselage was lengthened to create a rear area for a larger four-seat cockpit, and an antenna fairing was added to the tip of its vertical stabilizer. Grumman was awarded a $12.7 million contract to develop an EA-6B prototype on 14 November 1966. The Prowler first flew on 25 May 1968, and it entered service on aircraft carriers in July 1971. Three prototype EA-6Bs were converted from A-6As, and five EA-6Bs were developmental airplanes. A total of 170 EA-6B production aircraft were manufactured from 1966 through 1991.

The EA-6B Prowler was powered by two Pratt & Whitney J52 turbojet engines, and it was capable of high subsonic speeds. Due to its extensive electronic warfare operations, and the aircraft's age (produced until 1991), the EA-6B was a high-maintenance aircraft, and had undergone many frequent equipment upgrades. Although designed as an electronic warfare and command-and-control aircraft for air strike missions, the EA-6B was also capable of attacking some surface targets on its own, in particular enemy radar sites and surface-to-air missile launchers. In addition, the EA-6B was capable of gathering electronic signals intelligence.

The EA-6B Prowler was continually upgraded over the years. The first such upgrade was named "expanded capability" (EXCAP) beginning in 1973. Then came "improved capability" (ICAP) in 1976 and ICAP II in 1980. The ICAP II upgrade provided the EA-6B with the capability of firing Shrike missiles and AGM-88 HARM missiles.

Advanced Capability EA-6B

The Advanced Capability EA-6B Prowler (ADVCAP) was a development program initiated to improve the flying qualities of the EA-6B and to upgrade the avionics and electronic warfare systems. The intention was to modify all EA-6Bs into the ADVCAP configuration, however the program was removed from the Fiscal Year 1995 budget due to financial pressure from competing Department of Defense acquisition programs.

The ADVCAP development program was initiated in the late 1980s and was broken into three distinct phases: Full-Scale Development (FSD), Vehicle Enhancement Program (VEP) and the Avionics Improvement Program (AIP).

FSD served primarily to evaluate the new AN/ALQ-149 Electronic Warfare System. The program utilized a slightly modified EA-6B to house the new system.

The VEP added numerous changes to the aircraft to address deficiencies with the original EA-6B flying qualities, particularly lateral-directional problems that hampered recovery from out-of-control flight. Bureau Number 158542 was used. Changes included:
 Leading edge strakes (to improve directional stability)
 Fin pod extension (to improve directional stability)
 Ailerons (to improve slow speed lateral control)
 Re-contoured leading edge slats and trailing edge flaps (to compensate for an increase in gross weight)
 Two additional wing stations on the outer wing panel (for jamming pods only)
 New J52-P-409 engines (increased thrust by 2,000 lbf (8.9 kN) per engine)
 New digital Standard Automatic Flight Control System (SAFCS)

In previous models, when operating at sustained high angles of attack, fuel migration would cause additional shifts in CG with the result that the aircraft had slightly negative longitudinal static stability. Results of flight tests of the new configuration showed greatly improved flying qualities and the rearward shift of the CG had minimal impact.

The AIP prototype (bureau number 158547) represented the final ADVCAP configuration, incorporating all of the FSD and VEP modifications plus a completely new avionics suite which added multi-function displays to all crew positions, a head-up display for the pilot, and dual Global Positioning/Inertial navigation systems. The initial joint test phase between the contractor and the US Navy test pilots completed successfully with few deficiencies.

After the program was canceled, the three experimental Prowlers, BuNo 156482, 158542 and 158547, were mothballed until 1999. Over the next several years, the three aircraft were dismantled and reassembled to create a single aircraft, b/n 158542, which the Navy dubbed "FrankenProwler". It was returned to active service on 23 March 2005.

Improved Capability (ICAP) III
Northrop Grumman received contracts from the U.S. Navy to deliver new electronic countermeasures gear to Prowler squadrons; the heart of each ICAP III set consists of the ALQ-218 receiver and new software that provides more precise selective-reactive radar jamming and deception and threat location. The ICAP III sets also are equipped with the Multifunction Information Distribution System (MIDS), which includes the Link 16 data link system. Northrop delivered two lots and delivered two more beginning in 2010. The EA-6B Prowlers in service toward the end of its life were the ICAP III version, carrying the ALQ-99 Tactical Jamming System.

Design

Designed for carrier-based and advanced base operations, the EA-6B was a fully integrated electronic warfare system combining long-range, all-weather capabilities with advanced electronic countermeasures. A forward equipment bay and pod-shaped fairing on the vertical fin housed the additional avionics equipment. It was the primary electronic warfare aircraft for the U.S Navy and U.S. Marine Corps. The EA-6B's primary mission was to support ground-attack strikes by disrupting enemy electromagnetic activity. As a secondary mission it could also gather tactical electronic intelligence within a combat zone, and another secondary mission was attacking enemy radar sites with anti-radiation missiles.

The Prowler had a crew of four, a pilot and three Electronic Countermeasures Officers (known as ECMOs).

Design particulars included the refueling probe being asymmetrical, appearing bent to the right to improve pilot visibility over that of the A-6 Intruder. It contained an antenna near its root. The canopy had a shading of gold to protect the crew against the radio emissions that the electronic warfare equipment produces.

Operational history

The EA-6B entered service with Fleet Replacement Squadron VAQ-129 in September 1970, and Tactical Electronic Warfare Squadron 132 (VAQ-132) became the first operational squadron, in July 1971. Two squadrons of EA-6B Prowlers flew 720 sorties during the Vietnam War in support of US Navy attack aircraft and USAF B-52 bombers.

Following the Achille Lauro hijacking, on 10 October 1985 Prowlers from  provided ESM support during the interception of the EgyptAir 737 carrying four of the hijackers.

Prowlers jammed Libyan radar during Operation El Dorado Canyon in April 1986. Prowlers from VAQ-135 on  jammed Iranian Ground Control Intercept radars, surface-to-air missile guidance radars and communication systems during Operation Praying Mantis on 18 April 1988.

A total of 39 EA-6B Prowlers were involved in Operation Desert Storm in 1991, 27 from six aircraft carriers and 12 from USMC bases. During 4,600 flight hours, Prowlers fired over 150 HARM missiles. Navy Prowlers flew 1,132 sorties and USMC flew 516 with no losses.

With the retirement of the EF-111 Raven in 1998, the EA-6B was the only dedicated aerial radar jammer aircraft of the U.S. Armed Forces, until the fielding of the Navy's EA-18G Growler in 2009. The EA-6B was flown in almost all American combat operations from 1972 until its retirement in 2019, and was frequently flown in support of the U.S. Air Force missions.

In 2001, 124 Prowlers remained, divided between twelve Navy, four Marine, and four joint Navy-Air Force "Expeditionary" squadrons. A Joint Chiefs of Staff (JCS) staff study recommended that the EF-111 Raven be retired to reduce the types of aircraft dedicated to the same mission, which led to an Office of the Secretary of Defense (OSD) program memorandum to establish 4 land based "expeditionary" Prowler squadrons to meet the needs of the Air Force. From 2004-2014 the U.S. Air Force augmented Navy Prowler units with Electronic Warfare Officers from the 388th and 390th Electronic Combat Squadrons assigned to the 366th Operations Group at Mountain Home AFB, Idaho.

Though once considered being replaced by Common Support Aircraft, that plan failed to materialize. In 2009, the Navy EA-6B Prowler community began transitioning to the EA-18G Growler, a new electronic warfare derivative of the F/A-18F Super Hornet. All but one of the active duty Navy EA-6B squadrons were based at Naval Air Station Whidbey Island. VAQ-136 was stationed at Naval Air Facility Atsugi, Japan, as part of Carrier Air Wing 5, the forward deployed naval forces (FDNF) air wing that embarks aboard the Japan-based . VAQ-209, the Navy Reserve's sole EA-6B squadron, was stationed at Naval Air Facility Washington, Maryland. All Marine Corps EA-6B squadrons were located at Marine Corps Air Station Cherry Point, North Carolina.

In 2013, the USN planned to fly the EA-6B until 2015, while the USMC expect to phase out the Prowler in 2019. The last Navy operational flight took place on 27 May 2015. Electronic Attack Wing, U.S. Pacific Fleet (CVWP), hosted a retirement commemoration for the EA-6B from 25 to 27 June 2015 at NAS Whidbey Island.

Operations in Afghanistan, Iraq, and Syria

In 2007, it was reported that the Prowler had been used in counter improvised explosive device operations in the conflict in Afghanistan for several years by jamming remote detonation devices such as garage door openers or cellular telephones. Two Prowler squadrons were also based in Iraq, working with the same mission. According to Chuck Pfarrer in his book SEAL Target Geronimo, an EA-6B was also used to jam Pakistani radar and assist the 2 MH-60 Black Hawk stealth helicopters and 2 Chinook helicopters raiding Osama Bin Laden's compound in Operation Neptune Spear.

VMAQ-3 began flying Prowler missions against Islamic State militants over Iraq in June 2014.  Once Operation Inherent Resolve began in August, VMAQ-4 took over.  The Prowlers were the first Marine Corps aircraft in Syria and support strike packages, air drops, and electronic warfare requirements against militants.  By January 2015, the five aircraft of VMAQ-4 had flown 800 hours during 110 sorties in support of operations in both countries, including supporting coalition airstrikes and providing EW support for Iraqi Army forces to degrade enemy systems.  Marine Prowlers had not dropped munitions themselves and host nations basing them have not been revealed.

In April 2016, a squadron of EA-6B Prowlers from Marine Corps Tactical Electronic Warfare Squadron 4 (VMAQ-4), based at Marine Corps Air Station Cherry Point, North Carolina, was deployed to Incirlik Air Base, Turkey for operations over Syria. U.S. European Command confirmed that the deployment was expected to last through September 2016. The Center for Strategic and International Studies suggested that the Prowlers may be used to prevent Russian and Syrian air defense systems from tracking U.S. and coalition aircraft.

Prowlers of VMAQ-2 completed their last operational deployment to Al Udeid Air Base, Qatar in November 2018, and the squadron, the last equipped with the EA-6B, was disbanded on 8 March 2019, with its remaining two Prowlers being disposed of to museums.

Operators

The EA-6B Prowler was operated by the U.S. Armed Forces with squadrons in the U.S. Marine Corps and Navy.

USMC squadrons
VMAQ squadrons operated the EA-6B Prowler. Each of the three squadrons operated five aircraft; the squadrons were land-based, although they were capable of operating aboard U.S. Navy aircraft carriers and did so in the past.

In 2013, VMAQ-1 converted from an active to a training squadron as the USN stopped training on the Prowler and switched over to the Growler. The Marine Training squadron first received students for training in October 2013 and produced its first training flights in April 2014.

In 2008, the USMC investigated an electronic attack role for the Lockheed Martin F-35 Lightning II to replace their Prowlers. The Marines began retiring the EA-6 in 2016 and replaced them with the Marine Air-Ground Task Force Electronic Warfare (MAGTF-EW) concept, which calls for a medium to high-altitude long-endurance unmanned aerial vehicle to off-load at least some of the electronic warfare mission.

In November 2018, VMAQ-2 returned from performing the final deployed operations of USMC Prowlers. The Marines retired the aircraft on 8 March 2019, with some placed in storage and on static display at the Smithsonian Institution Steven F. Udvar-Hazy Center of the National Air and Space Museum in Chantilly, Virginia and the Frontiers of Flight Museum at Dallas Love Field.

USN squadrons
While in U.S. Navy service four EA-6B Prowlers were typically assigned to a Tactical Electronic Warfare Squadron. These Navy Electronic Attack squadrons carried the letters VAQ (V-fixed wing, A-attack, Q-electronic); most of these squadrons were carrier-based, while others were "expeditionary" and deployed to overseas land bases.

Disestablished Squadrons
VAQ-128: Established as an expeditionary squadron in October 1997, utilizing the insignia and heritage of the former A-6 Intruder Fleet Replacement Squadron at NAS Whidbey Island.  Disestablished in September 2004 due to budget reductions.

VAQ-309: Established as a Naval Air Reserve Force squadron at NAS Whidbey Island in 1979 with EA-6A aircraft, transitioning to the EA-6B in 1989 as part of Carrier Air Wing Reserve THIRTY (CVWR-30).  Disestablished on 31 Dec 1994 following the decommissioning of CVWR-30 due to budget cuts; aircraft returned to the Regular Navy.

Notable accidents
While no Prowler has ever been lost in combat, nearly fifty of the 170 built were destroyed in various accidents as of 2013. In 1998, a memorial at Naval Air Station Whidbey Island was dedicated to 44 crew members lost in EA-6B aircraft accidents.
The Prowler was running out of fuel after a missed approach ("bolter" in Navy parlance), and its crash and the subsequent fire and explosions destroyed or damaged 19 other aircraft.
 On 3 November 1992 a US Navy EA-6B Prowler (161776,P99 First lCAP ll) from VAQ 129 crashed after takeoff outside of Naval Air Facility, El Centro killing all three crew members aboard; Crew included Capt. Peter Limoge (USMC), LT. Charles Gurley (USN), LT. Dave Roberts (USN).  Los Angeles Times 11/5/1992
In August 1996, an EA-6B crashed during low level training, killing all four Marines aboard; pilot, Capt. Gregory O. Glaeser, Capt. Brian F. Hussey, Lt. Col. Joseph E. Connell II, and Maj. John S. Bacheller. Connell was the squadron skipper of VMAQ-1.
 On 3 February 1998, a USMC EA-6B Prowler, BuNo 163045, from VMAQ-2 struck the cables of a cablecar system in Cavalese, Italy. The crew broke rules to fly low at high speed in mountainous terrain, cut the cables and caused the death of 20 people. The aircraft also suffered severe damage to its vertical stabiliser and wings as a result of striking the cable, but was landed successfully at Aviano Air Base.
On 11 March 2013, a USN EA-6B of Electronic Attack Squadron VAQ-129 in Washington State, crashed during a training exercise. LTJG Valerie Cappelaere Delaney (Pilot), LTJG William Brown McIlvaine III (Flight Officer), and LCDR Alan A. Patterson (Instructor and Flight Officer) were killed. A year later, an investigation determined that the Prowler experienced a controlled flight into terrain that was due to pilot error.

Variants 

 EA-6A: Two early production A-6As converted to EA-6As as prototypes. Total of 25 EA-6As were built, including 10 conversions of A-6As and 15 production EA-6As.
 EA-6B: Three A-6As converted as initial prototypes. Total of 170 EA-6Bs were built.

Aircraft on display

Japan
 160786 – EA-6B on static display at Naval Air Facility Atsugi in Yamato, Kanagawa.

United States

 147865 – EA-6A on static display at Marine Corps Air Station Cherry Point in Havelock, North Carolina.
 148618 – EA-6A on static display at Naval Air Station Key West in Big Coppitt Key, Florida.
 149475 – EA-6A on static display at the Wisconsin National Guard Memorial Library and Museum at Volk Field Air National Guard Base in Camp Douglas, Wisconsin.
 156481 – EA-6B on static display at the National Naval Aviation Museum in Pensacola, Florida.
 156478 – EA-6B on static display at Naval Air Station Whidbey Island in Oak Harbor, Washington.
 156984 – EA-6A on static display at the Warner Museum of Aviation and Transportation in Sioux City, Iowa.
 158029 – EA-6B on static display at Naval Air Station Patuxent River in Lexington Park, Maryland.
 158033 – EA-6B on static display at Patuxent River Naval Air Museum in Lexington Park, Maryland.
 158034 – EA-6B on static display at Charles B. Hall Airpark at Tinker Air Force Base in Oklahoma City, Oklahoma.
 158036 – EA-6B on static display at Naval Air Station Whidbey Island in Oak Harbor, Washington.
 158542 FrankenProwler – EA-6B on static display at the Pima Air & Space Museum in Tucson, Arizona. Three different ADVCAP airframes were assembled to create this one airframe.
 158810 – EA-6B on static display at Naval Air Station Fallon in Fallon, Nevada.
 158811 – EA-6B on static display at the Pacific Coast Air Museum in Santa Rosa, California.
 160432 – EA-6B on static display at Marine Corps Air Station Cherry Point in Havelock, North Carolina.
 160436 – EA-6B on static display at the Castle Air Museum in Atwater, California.
 160609 – EA-6B on static display at Naval Air Station Jacksonville in Jacksonville, Florida.
 161882 – EA-6B on static display at the Flying Leatherneck Aviation Museum in San Diego, California.
 161884 – EA-6B on static display at the Museum of Flight in Seattle, Washington. It is on loan from the National Naval Aviation Museum at Pensacola, Florida.
162228 – EA-6B on static display at the Frontiers of Flight Museum at Dallas Love Field in Dallas, Texas. This aircraft along with 162230 participated in the decommissioning of VMAQ-2 in March, 2019. 
162230 – EA-6B on static display at the Smithsonian Institution's Steven F. Udvar-Hazy Center in Chantilly, Virginia.  This aircraft along with 162228 participated in the decommissioning of VMAQ-2 in March, 2019.
 162935 – EA-6B on static display at the USS Midway Museum in San Diego, California.
 162938 – EA-6B on static display at the American Airpower Museum in Farmingdale, New York.
 163033 – EA-6B on static display at the Hickory Aviation Museum in Hickory, North Carolina. It flew to the museum from Marine Corps Air Station Cherry Point.
 163047 – EA-6B on static display at the MAPS Air Museum in Akron, Ohio
 163395 – EA-6B on static display at the United States Naval Academy in Annapolis, Maryland.
 163886 – EA-6B on static display at the Wings Over the Rockies Air and Space Museum in Denver, Colorado.
 163890 – EA-6B on static display at Naval Base Ventura County in Camarillo, California. 
 164401 – EA-6B on static display at Naval Support Activity Crane in Crane, Indiana.

Specifications (EA-6B)

See also

References
Notes

Bibliography

 Donald, David ed. "Northrop Grumman EA-6B Prowler", Warplanes of the Fleet. AIRtime, 2004. .
 Miska, Kurt H. "Grumman A-6A/E Intruder; EA-6A; EA6B Prowler (Aircraft in Profile number 252)". Aircraft in Profile, Volume 14. Windsor, Berkshire, UK: Profile Publications Ltd., 1974, p. 137–160. .

External links

 EA-6B Prowler Fact File  and EA-6B history on Navy.mil
 EA-6B Prowler on GlobalSecurity.org
 EA-6B Gondola Mishap, Cavalese, Italy, 3 February 1998, Aviation Safety Consulting Services,
 The Grumman A-6 Intruder & EA-6B Prowler (airvectors.net)

EA-006B Prowler
1960s United States electronic warfare aircraft
Twinjets
Carrier-based aircraft
EA-006B Prowler
Mid-wing aircraft
Aircraft first flown in 1968